Winston Churchill Doby (February 20, 1940 – November 10, 2011) was one of UCLA’s vice chancellors.  He was vice chancellor of student affairs for 20 years, making him the longest-serving vice chancellor in UCLA history, and then served as the vice president of student affairs for the UC system.

Early life
His mother Laura taught him a creed about always remembering to do the right thing, which he carried for his entire life. His history with UCLA began in the 1950s when he was a track and field city champion from Fremont High with plans to attend Compton College. However, his track coach, Bill Thayer, was a UCLA alumnus who thought differently. Thayer, aware of Doby's athletic talent and academic prowess, drove him to UCLA during the last week of school, urging the coaches to award him a scholarship. His only request was that Doby come back and teach for 3 years before deciding what he wanted to do with his life. Nearly a lifetime of service later, Doby made an indelible impression in education and at UCLA as one of the highest-ranking African Americans in the entire UC system.

He received three degrees from UCLA: a bachelor's in mathematics, a master's in education, and a doctorate in higher education administration.  Then in return, he gave back to the school that provided his education. He was the driving force behind building the Arthur Ashe Student Health and Wellness Center, the Tom Bradley International Hall, and the renovation of the John Wooden Center.

Teaching
After graduating from UCLA with a degree in mathematics, Doby fulfilled a commitment to his high school mentor by returning to his alma mater, Fremont High School in Los Angeles, as a mathematics teacher. In 1968, Doby returned to UCLA to pursue graduate studies. After a one-year stint as Assistant Track Coach, he joined the administration full-time and held a variety of positions while completing work on his master's degree in education, with a focus on measurement and statistics, and his doctorate in higher education administration at UCLA.

Lasting Legacy
He rose through UCLA's ranks to become vice chancellor of student affairs, heading an organization responsible for providing programs and services to 36,000 students — encompassing such units as undergraduate admissions, financial aid, the registrar's office, dean of students, residential life, health services and outreach. He led campaigns to build the Arthur Ashe Student Health and Wellness Center, the Tom Bradley International Hall and to renovate the Wooden Center and the Men's Gym.
Over the years, Doby chaired numerous task groups including one charged with developing a plan for addressing the impacts of Proposition 209. He served as co-chair of the UCLA outreach steering committee in addition to leading system wide task forces focused on the delivery of student services in the next decade and on enhancing the synergy between UC admissions and outreach policies.

Doby was also an active "UCLA ambassador" in the larger community, particularly in the area of K-12 education. For more than a decade, he served as an external member of the Los Angeles Unified School District's Evaluation Planning Team, with a special focus on issues of student achievement, school desegregation, busing, and overcrowding. He also conducted multiple interviews at 12 elementary schools in LAUSD as part of a comprehensive evaluation of its Ten Schools Program.

In 1971 Doby started the Academic Advancement Program (AAP) that is now used all over the country. The primary focus was and is to widen college access for students from historically underrepresented backgrounds.

Doby co-founded the community-based Young Black Scholars Program, which has helped to prepare thousands of young students for college in its 14-year history. In the early '90s, he founded the Black Male Achievement Project at Ralph Bunche Elementary School and launched the Los Angeles Sports Academy, designed to promote academic achievement through sport. He also founded a charter school for high school dropouts and was a key contributor to a middle school pilot program developed to improve mathematics competency.  Dr. Doby worked tirelessly to help young people attend college; he was instrumental in establishing the UCLA/Black Alumni Association's "Ella Fitzgerald Memorial Scholarship".

“No written word or spoken plea can teach the children what they should be, nor all the books on all the shelves, it’s what the teachers are themselves,” former coach
John Wooden said, applying one of his famous quotations to Doby's success as an educator.

Family
He has two children, Monica and Chris, and an ex-wife Althea. His daughter, Monica, was a Grammy nominated R&B singer in the group Brownstone and is now a teacher like her father. His son Christopher owns an award-winning social media company.

References

1940 births
2011 deaths
University of California, Los Angeles faculty
Schoolteachers from California
People from Los Angeles
African-American academics
Place of birth missing
20th-century American mathematicians
University of California, Los Angeles alumni
21st-century American mathematicians
20th-century African-American people
21st-century African-American people